Jack Walter Lambert CBE (1917-1986) was an English arts journalist, editor and broadcaster.

Selected publications
 Cornwall. Penguin, 1939.
 New English Dramatists 3. Penguin, 1960. (Editor) 
 New English Dramatists 3. Penguin, 1961. (Editor)
 New English Dramatists 4. Penguin, 1962. (Editor)
 The Bodley Head Saki. Bodley Head, London, 1963. (Editor)
 Drama in Britain, 1964-73. 1974.
 The Bodley Head, 1887-1987. The Bodley Head, London, 1987. (completed by Michael Ratcliffe)

References

External links 
http://genome.ch.bbc.co.uk/4422701c40854e11b8098c8cec4f4fd1
http://www.bbc.co.uk/news/world-asia-43521809

1917 births
English journalists
English non-fiction writers
English editors
1986 deaths
English broadcasters